Shivan Pillay a/l Asokan (born 7 December 2000) is a Malaysian footballer who plays as a centre-back for Malaysia Super League club Perak.

Early life and career 
Shivan was born into a Tamil-Malaysian family, in Kuala Krai, Kelantan. Pillay is of Chindian (Tamil/Chinese) descent through his mother.

Pillay attended Sri KDU Secondary School in Petaling Jaya, Selangor. In 2016, Pillay participated in, and went on to win, Telekom Malaysia's Mencari Ramli 5 football reality show. As one of the 15 winners of the show, Pillay won the chance to participate in an intensive football coaching session in Manchester, England.

Honours

Club
PKNS 
 President Cup : 2019

International
Malaysia U19
 AFF U-19 Youth Championship: 2018

Endorsements 
Pillay has been an Adidas Malaysia ambassador since 2019.

References

External links
 
 Shivan Pillay on Instagram

Living people
2000 births
Malaysian footballers
People from Kelantan
People from Selangor
Malaysian people of Tamil descent
Malaysian sportspeople of Indian descent
Malaysian sportspeople of Chinese descent
Association football defenders
Malaysia international footballers
Malaysia Super League players
PKNS F.C. players
Association football midfielders